Ghogare is a small village in Ratnagiri district, Maharashtra state in Western India. The 2011 Census of India recorded a total of 431 residents in the village.

References

Villages in Ratnagiri district